The League of Peja, also known as League of İpek or Besa-Besë (Pledge for a Pledge) between Albanians, was an Albanian political organization established in 1899 in the city of İpek (now Peja), Kosovo Vilayet, Ottoman Empire. It was led by Haxhi Zeka, a former member of the League of Prizren, and shared the same aim of achieving an autonomous Albanian vilayet within the Ottoman Empire. This organization was encouraged and supported by Austria-Hungary and directed against Ottoman reforms and against Serbs from Kosovo Vilayet.

Albanian patriotic circles had been seeing a need of creating a new organisation, similar to the first League of Prizren, and to include all the Albanian lands and place it in front of a national movement.

The first efforts for the creation of the League began in September 1896. Haxhi Zeka was named as head of this movement by the most influential Albanian leaders in the Ottoman province of Kosovo (Kosovo villayet was one of four Ottoman provinces – vilayets – with a significant Albanian presence).

Albanian leaders led by Haxhi Zeka organised a meeting in Yakova (now Gjakova) in March–April 1897 as a first step for the creation of the league.  There were two groups of members. The first group of conservative and more moderate members wanted five vilayets (with Salonika vilayet included) to be united into the Albanian vilayet, and the second group of the more radical members wanted full administrative autonomy for the four vilayets united in the Albanian vilayet.

The League ended its activity in 1900, after an armed conflict with the Ottoman forces. Zeka was assassinated by a Serbian agent Adem Zajmi in 1902.

See also
Selim Rusi

References

Organizations based in Kosovo
Kosovo vilayet
Albanian revolutionary organizations
Peja
Albanian Question